Grizzly is the name of four unrelated fictional characters appearing in American comic books published by Marvel Comics. The first is a wild west villain, the second is an A.I.M. Agent, the third is a foe of Spider-Man, and the fourth is a mutant and member of Six Pack.

Publication history
The third Grizzly is ex-wrestler Maxwell "Max" Markham, one of Spider-Man's enemies. He first appeared in The Amazing Spider-Man #139 (Dec. 1974) and was created by Gerry Conway and Ross Andru.

The fourth Grizzly is Theodore Winchester. He first appeared in X-Force #8 and was created by Rob Liefeld.

Fictional characters biographies

Grizzly (Ace Fenton)

Ace Fenton is a criminal in the Old West who went by the Grizzly name. As the Grizzly made off with money he robbed from the bank, he ran afoul of Two-Gun Kid and the Rawhide Kid. After his rifle ran out, he ran off with his steel-lined suit protecting him from their bullets. When Rawhide Kid was suspected of robbing a train, Two-Gun Kid advised him to turn himself over. Ace Fenton himself began stirring up the people of Tombstone to turn against the Rawhide Kid claiming that he trained the Grizzly to rob a train. On the day of the trial, Grizzly broke into the courtroom and abducted Rawhide Kid to make it look like they are partners in crime. He tried to kill Rawhide Kid, but this failed and his mask was removed. Rawhide Kid was not able to get a glimpse of the Grizzly's face when he ran off. Rawhide Kid and Two-Gun Kid found his empty costume and headed to a saloon that the Grizzly had made on mistake. When Ace Fenton revealed himself as the Grizzly, he and Rawhide Kid got into a gunfight. Rawhide Kid defeated Ace Fenton and handed him over to the authorities.

Grizzly (A.I.M. operative)

A.I.M. had sent Grizzly and Agent R-2 to capture an atomic scientist named Paul Fosgrave at Manning University. Posing as students, they persuaded Mart Baker to help them by using the Hypno-Ray to turn protests into hostile activities as a cover to capture Paul Fosgrave. Mart Baker demanded that his committee be placed in control of the university and the student body divided against each other resulting in a massive fight. Captain America showed up at the scene and MODOK instructed Grizzly and Agent R-2 to capture Paul Fosgrave immediately. As they brought Paul Fosgrave to the roof where their portable copter was waiting, Captain America pursued them with the help of Mart Baker (learning that he was duped by them). Grizzly tried to escape on the copter with Paul Fosgrave, but Captain America shot the copter down with Grizzly's gun. Fosgrave was brought to safety, Agent R-2 was defeated, and Mart Baker and his followers were granted amnesty by the University. Grizzly's fate after the copter crashed is unrevealed.

Grizzly (Maxwell "Max" Markham)

Maxwell Markham is a professional wrestler who competed using the nom de guerre of the Grizzly. His violent actions brought him to the attention of J. Jonah Jameson, whose articles got Maxwell expelled from wrestling. Ten years later, he met with the Jackal, who gave him a grizzly bear suit and an exoskeleton harness that amplified his strength and durability. He used this harness to attack the Daily Bugle in an attempt to get revenge against Jameson for ruining his wrestling career, but Spider-Man defeated him. The Grizzly then attempted to defeat Spider-Man alongside the Jackal, but was defeated again by Spider-Man and went to jail.

After his release, Markham took his grizzly suit and exoskeleton harness to the Tinkerer for them to be fixed and upgraded. The Grizzly demanded a rematch with Spider-Man so that he could take revenge on Spider-Man and save face among his peers. Spider-Man faked defeat, allowing the Grizzly to think he defeated him.

He later joined up with the Gibbon, the Spot, and the Kangaroo II to become the Legion of Losers. Planning only to get back at Spider-Man, the Grizzly and the Gibbon were shocked to see the Kangaroo II and the Spot robbing a bank. They did capture Spider-Man, but released him, claiming that "He's an all-right guy".The Grizzly and the Gibbon teamed up with Spider-Man to capture the Kangaroo II and the Spot. The Grizzly and the Gibbon later became crime-fighters and helped Spider-Man (disguised as the Bombastic Bag-Man) again to stop the White Rabbit's bank robbery.

At one point, out on probation, he tries to turn his life around. His desire to keep wearing the suit, several accidents and the interference of his criminal friends make his life that much more miserable.

He was brought in by S.H.I.E.L.D. at one point or another, and his interrogation yielded key information that would drive the events of the "Secret War".

Later, he is receiving legal services from the law offices that employ the She-Hulk. He had been accused of a robbery at Madison Square Garden, but his defense was to be that he had been seen fighting Power Pack in New Jersey at the same time.

The Grizzly meets Starfox moments later. Not understanding that Walter's employers have taken on villains for a client, he believes his old Avengers comrade is being menaced by supervillains. The Grizzly is punched out by Starfox.

For a time, Maxwell works as an enforcer for the crime lord Hammerhead. With a new costume and fangs, he teams with a stylized Boomerang. At one point, he claims to have a child and that he used his child's college fund to pay for his fangs.

Following the "Civil War" storyline, Maxwell is a self-confessed loser at the wake of the Stilt-Man. Almost all of the supervillains at the wake were the victims of murder/attempted murder: the Punisher disguised himself as a barman, poisoned the drinks, and then blew up the bar. Due to prompt medical attention, there were no actual fatalities.

Alyosha Kraven later began collecting a zoo of animal-themed superhumans, including the Bushmaster, the Gargoyle, Tiger Shark, the Kangaroo II, Aragorn, the Vulture, the Mongoose, the Man-Bull, Dragon Man, Swarm, the Mandrill, the Frog-Man and the Rhino. In the end, the Punisher managed to sabotage this zoo; though Kraven himself escaped to the Savage Land.

Stephen Colbert's fear of bears is well known, so the Grizzly was the natural choice for a villain when Colbert teamed up with Spider-Man as part of a storyline where Stephen Colbert is a major candidate for the presidency in the fictional Marvel Universe.

The Hood sends the Grizzly to take out the Punisher and anyone working with him. However, the Grizzly walked into a trap, with nothing but explosives waiting for him, which the Punisher's assistant then detonated.The Grizzly somehow survived the explosion, and was one of the criminals who later confronted the Punisher.

Norman Osborn then appoints the Grizzly to the Thunderbolts, sending him on a mission to aid them against the Agents of Atlas. During this time, the Grizzly started wearing a coat that has a bear-shaped hood on it instead of his usual exoskeleton bear suit.The Grizzly is also made the commander of a squadron of B.A.T.F.E. agents.The Grizzly also joins the Thunderbolts in their mission to retrieve the Spear of Odin during the Siege of Asgard.

During the "Heroic Age" storyline, the Grizzly was shown as an inmate at the Raft when Hank Pym brings the students from the Avengers Academy over for a tour.

The Hobgoblin later gave an enhanced version of one of the Grizzly's old exoskeleton bear suits to an unnamed criminal who took on the name the Bruin in order to build his reputation. He, Blaze II, and the Devil-Spider II took part in a heist until they encountered the Superior Spider-Man (Doctor Octopus's mind in Spider-Man's body) in the Venom symbiote.

The Grizzly later attended a support group called Supervillains Anonymous that was held at a church and also attended by Boomerang, Doctor Bong, the Hippo, the Looter, the Mirage, the Porcupine II, and others. At another Supervillains Anonymous meeting, the Grizzly and the Looter talk about their run-ins with Spider-Man.

While sporting a new version of his exoskeleton bear suit, the Grizzly travels to Miami and attacks Scott Lang, mistaking him for his enemy Eric O'Grady and unaware that Eric is dead. After the misunderstanding is cleared up, Scott offers the Grizzly a job at the newly established Ant-Man Security Solutions. On Scott Lang's behalf, the Grizzly enlisted Machinesmith to help rescue Cassandra Lang from Cross Technological Enterprises, and later aids him against a revenge attack by Darren Cross, Crossfire, and Egghead.

During the "Secret Empire" storyline, the Grizzly and Machinesmith join up with the Army of Evil during HYDRA's rise to power.

Grizzly (Theodore Winchester)

Theodore Winchester was one of the members of Cable's mercenary group originally named the Wild Pack. Grizzly participated in the Wild Pack's raid on a HYDRA base ten years ago. Grizzly also participated in the Wild Pack's mission in Iran. Because of conflicts with Silver Sable's group of the same name, they later changed their name to the Six Pack instead. Grizzly participated in the Six Pack's confrontations with Stryfe in Afghanistan and Uruguay. During a mission for the arms dealer Tolliver, the Six Pack fell apart.

Years later, G. W. Bridge, another Six Pack-member, asked Grizzly to join Weapon P.R.I.M.E., a group created to capture Cable. Weapon P.R.I.M.E. attacked Cable and his team, X-Force. Grizzly was defeated by Warpath, and the mission failed.

Grizzly left the team, then teamed up with Domino in her search for X-Force. Grizzly is then reunited with fellow former Six Pack member Hammer. Grizzly, Domino, and Hammer then captured the shape-shifter, Vanessa. Domino joined X-Force shortly afterwards and Grizzly went home to lead a quiet life.

Some time later, he became a serial killer while under mind control from Genesis, Cable's son. Domino investigated the deaths and fought with Grizzly. She was forced to kill him, but promised the dying Grizzly not to tell Cable about his son's actions.

Grizzly reappeared alive in Deadpool & Cable: Split Second.

Powers and abilities
Ace Fester wore a grizzly bear suit that is lined with steel to protect him from bullets. He can use his paws to manipulate rifles.

The A.I.M version uses a laser pistol in combat.

Maxwell "Max" Markham wears an exoskeleton bear suit which grants him superhuman strength and durability, designed by Professor Miles Warren and later modified by the Tinkerer. The Grizzly suit also has razor-sharp claws. As a former professional wrestler, he is adept in hand-to-hand combat.

Theodore Winchester is a mutant who was born with superhuman strength, speed, stamina, senses and size. His appearance is a furry reddish orange hide and he has razor-sharp fangs and claws. He sometimes utilized conventional firearms.

Reception
 In 2022, CBR.com ranked the Max Markham version of Grizzly 4th in their "Spider-Man's 10 Funniest Villains" list.

Other versions

Age of Apocalypse
In the Age of Apocalypse timeline, Theodore Winchester was a bestial mass murderer and one of Domino's minions. They worked for Apocalypse. They attacked Forge's resistance group, the Outcasts.

Grizzly was killed by Forge and Sonique after killing their friend Toad.

Ultimate Marvel
Ultimate Marvel's Grizzly was introduced in the second part of the "Cable" story arc starting in Ultimate X-Men #76. This version is from Ultimate Cable's future and seems to resemble a taciturn Native American with long, dark hair when in human form and more literally resembles a grizzly bear after transforming for battle. His present day counterpart appears in Ultimate X-Men #81 as a student at the school.

1872
During the "Secret Wars" storyline, a Wild West version of the Maxwell "Max" Markham version of Grizzly resides in the Battleworld domain of the Valley of Doom. He is a minion of Governor Roxxon alongside Bullseye, Elektra, and Otto Octavius where they are first seen intimidating Judge Franklin Nelson into leaving town so that he would not preside over Red Wolf's trial. Sheriff Steve Rogers and Red Wolf later fight the four villains, which ended with Otto Octavius getting killed in battle, Bullseye killing Sheriff Rogers, and Natasha Barnes diverting Elektra and Grizzly into another direction so that Red Wolf can escape. Red Wolf later fought Elektra and Grizzly again, where he managed to defeat them.

In other media

Television
 The Maxwell "Max" Markham version of Grizzly appears in Ultimate Spider-Man, voiced by John DiMaggio. This version wears bear-themed armor and is depicted as being on the S.H.I.E.L.D. most wanted list. In the episode "House Arrest", Spider-Man fights against Grizzly until the S.H.I.E.L.D. Trainees arrived. When Spider-Man is able to defeat Grizzly, he lands in the dumpster when the police arrive. In the episode "Burrito Run", Grizzly is mind-controlled by Mesmero into accompanying Boomerang and Shocker into attacking Spider-Man, Power Man and Squirrel Girl. During the fight against Mesmero on the rooftops, Squirrel Girl managed to knock Grizzly off the rooftop and into a dumpster.

Video games

 The Theodore Winchester version of Grizzly is a boss in X-Men Legends II: Rise of Apocalypse, voiced by Keith Ferguson. Grizzly claims to work for Apocalypse because he is allowed to go crazy and kill people. Jean Grey believes him to be controlled, but Grizzly refuses to let himself be helped. He has special dialogue with Iceman and Jean Grey.

References

External links
 Grizzly (Maxwell Markham) at Marvel.com
 Grizzly (AoA) at Marvel.com
 Grizzly (Ace Fenton) at Marvel Wiki
 Grizzly (A.I.M. Agent) at Marvel Wiki
 Grizzly (Maxwell Markham) at Marvel Wiki
 Grizzly (Theodore Winchester) at Marvel Wiki
 Grizzly (Maxwell Markham) at Comic Vine
 
 

Articles about multiple fictional characters
Characters created by Dick Ayers
Characters created by Fabian Nicieza
Characters created by Gerry Conway
Characters created by Rob Liefeld
Characters created by Ross Andru
Characters created by Stan Lee
Comics characters introduced in 1964
Comics characters introduced in 1969
Comics characters introduced in 1974
Comics characters introduced in 1992
Fictional characters with superhuman senses
Fictional mercenaries in comics
Fictional professional wrestlers
Marvel Comics characters with superhuman strength
Marvel Comics male supervillains
Marvel Comics martial artists
Marvel Comics mutants
Marvel Comics supervillains
Spider-Man characters
X-Men supporting characters